Gare de Carhaix is a railway station serving the town Carhaix-Plouguer, Finistère department, western France. The station is served by regional trains to Guingamp. The station was the hub of the Réseau Breton.

References

TER Bretagne
Railway stations in France opened in 1891
Railway stations in Finistère